John Patrick Kerin (March 3, 1875 – March 16, 1946) was an American professional baseball umpire.

Umpiring career
Kerin spent several seasons in the New England League and Eastern League before his major league service.

Notable games
After a September 1908 Chicago White Sox game, Kerin suffered a broken nose and was unconscious for a few minutes following a punch by an angry fan. The fan, attorney Robert Cantwell, was known locally for his defense of murder cases. Cantwell was later arrested for the assault.

References

1875 births
1946 deaths
Baseball people from Massachusetts
Major League Baseball umpires
People from Townsend, Massachusetts
Sportspeople from Middlesex County, Massachusetts